Live Cannibalism is a live album by American death metal band Cannibal Corpse, released in 2000 through Metal Blade Records. It was also released as a DVD.

Track listing

Album notes
Most of the album was recorded live at The Rave in Milwaukee on February 16, 2000. Tracks 3, 5, 6, 12 and 15 were recorded the day prior at The Emerson Theater in Indianapolis.

Personnel
George "Corpsegrinder" Fisher – vocals
Pat O'Brien – lead guitar
Jack Owen – rhythm guitar
Alex Webster – bass
Paul Mazurkiewicz – drums

References 

Cannibal Corpse live albums
Cannibal Corpse video albums
2000 live albums
Metal Blade Records live albums
Metal Blade Records video albums
2000 video albums